
The Millicoma River is a coast stream, about  long, east of Coos Bay in the U.S. state of Oregon. Formed by the confluence of the East Fork Millicoma River and the West Fork Millicoma River at Allegany, it meanders across relatively flat land to meet the South Fork Coos River, with which it forms the Coos River.

Oregon Route 241 (Coos River Highway) runs along the right bank of the river from Allegany to the mouth. The Millicoma meanders generally southwest, receiving Woodruff Creek from the left slightly downstream from Allegany. Deton Creek enters from the right at Rooke Higgins County Park near river mile (RM) 3.5 or river kilometer (RK) 5.6. About a half-mile later, Hendrickson Creek enters from the left.

The Millicoma supports a large run of shad as well as runs of Chinook salmon and steelhead, all of which may be fished for. It also supports runs of Coho salmon, but fishing for them in the Millicoma is not allowed. Rooke Higgins County Park has a boat launch as does Doras Ramp, near the mouth.

See also
List of rivers of Oregon

References

Works cited
McArthur, Lewis A., and McArthur, Lewis L. (2003) [1928]. Oregon Geographic Names, 7th ed. Portland: Oregon Historical Society Press. .
Sheehan, Madelynne Diness (2005). Fishing in Oregon: The Complete Oregon Fishing Guide, 10th ed. Scappoose, Oregon: Flying Pencil Publications. .

External links
Coos Watershed Association

Rivers of Coos County, Oregon
Rivers of Oregon
Oregon placenames of Native American origin